Elizabeth Anne Yelling (née Talbot; born 5 December 1974, Welwyn Garden City, Hertfordshire) is a British long-distance runner currently based in Poole, Dorset. She is the sister-in-law of fellow British runner Hayley Yelling through her marriage to steeplechaser Martin Yelling and is the former training partner of Paula Radcliffe.

Yelling has taken part in the marathon at two summer Olympic Games; she finished 25th at Athens 2004 and 26th at Beijing 2008.

Yelling won the bronze medal in the 2006 Commonwealth Games marathon. She also holds the women's course record for: the Bath Half Marathon with a time of 69 minutes 28 seconds set in 2007; and the Reading Half Marathon in 69 minutes 35 seconds, set in 2008.

Achievements
All results regarding marathon, unless stated otherwise

Personal bests

References

External links

1974 births
Sportspeople from Welwyn Garden City
Living people
English female middle-distance runners
British female long-distance runners
Athletes (track and field) at the 2004 Summer Olympics
Athletes (track and field) at the 2008 Summer Olympics
Olympic athletes of Great Britain
Commonwealth Games medallists in athletics
Commonwealth Games bronze medallists for England
Athletes (track and field) at the 2006 Commonwealth Games
Medallists at the 2006 Commonwealth Games